Dongshi Township, also Dongshih Township, is a rural township in Chiayi County, Taiwan.

History
After WWII, Dongshi Township was under the jurisdiction of Tainan County. In 1950, it was put under the jurisdiction of Chiayi County .

Geography
It has a population total of 23,327 and an area of 81.5821 km2. Its coastline is 14 km in total length.

Administrative divisions
Tungshi, Yuanshu, Xingcuo, Wengang, Sanjia, Yongtun, Haipu, Longgang, Pilai, Xiayi, Dingyi, Xixia, Gangkou, Aogu, Gangqi, Niaosong, Weitan, Zhouzi, Tunglun, Xilun, Wenzi, Wangliao and Zhangtan Village.

Tourist attractions
 Aogu Wetland
 Dongshi Fisherman's Wharf
 Dongshi Natural Ecological Exhibition Center
 Dongshih Lake
 Gangkou Temple
 Lusih Forest
 Waisanding Offshore Sandbar

Transportation
The township is connected to Shuishang Township through Provincial Highway 82.

Notable natives
 Hsiao Teng-tzang, Minister of Justice (1988-1989)
 Huang Min-hui, Mayor of Chiayi City

References

External links

 Dongshi Township 

Townships in Chiayi County